The 2016–17 Coupe de France preliminary rounds, Paris-Île-de-France made up the qualifying competition to decide which teams from the Paris and Île-de-France leagues took part in the main competition from round 7. This was the 100th season of the most prestigious football cup competition of France. The competition was organised by the French Football Federation (FFF) and is open to all clubs in French football, as well as clubs from the overseas departments and territories (Guadeloupe, French Guiana, Martinique, Mayotte, New Caledonia (qualification via 2016 New Caledonia Cup), Tahiti (qualification via 2016 Tahiti Cup), Réunion, and Saint Martin).

The qualifying rounds took place between April and October 2016.

First round
These matches were played between 24 April and 5 May 2016. Note that Tiers refer to the 2015–16 season.

First round results: Île-de-France

Second round 
These matches were scheduled between 22 May and 31 August 2016. Note that Tiers refer to the 2015–16 season.

Second round results: Île-de-France

Third round
These matches were played on 11 September 2016.

Third round results: Île-de-France

Fourth round
These matches were played on 24 and 25 September 2016.

Fourth round results: Île-de-France

Fifth round
These matches were played on 8 and 9 October 2016 with the remaining fixtures scheduled for 16 October 2016.

Fifth round results: Île-de-France

References

Preliminary rounds